Peking University Third Hospital (PUTH, PUH3) is public district general hospital was founded in 1958 under the supervision of the Ministry of Health. It is affiliated with Peking University including 36 clinical departments and 1,752 clinic beds. The hospital is a combination of medical services, medical education/teaching, research and prevention as well as health care, comprehensive hospital in the first-rate of three levels that set by China government.

Overview

It is a designated hospital which served the Olympics 2008, with a staff then of 2,295. It has 1,752 clinic beds and 36 clinic departments. Its Reproductive Medicine Center is not only the earliest founded but also the largest center in Asia; its Spinal Surgery Department is the strongest in China mainland, and is the only center designated for treatment of sports people by the Chinese Olympic Committee. Its Cardiology Department is in an advanced position in China, and has the key lab for molecular cardiology of the China education department. It specializes in Ophthalmology, Digestion Medicine, treatment for early stage Gastric Cancer, Plastic Surgery and Occupational Diseases and is among the top in China.

Peking University Third Hospital has been equipped with much sophisticated equipment;- CT, SPECT, MRI, new vascular angiography, stereo angiography, color Doppler for heart, abdominal color ultra sound electronic video camera, ultra sound endoscope, external stone crusher, isotope renography, autobiochemistry analysis machine, radio-immunity test instrument, renal dialysis and a laser treatment machine. This advanced equipment is playing a more and more important role in examining and curing various common and complicated diseases.

The hospital plays a very important role in teaching as well. Its teaching tasks include Clinical Medicine, Pharmacy, Nursing, Lab Medicine and Preventive Medicine. It also trains a huge number of post-graduates and medical observers. Its 15 departments are assigned training tasks for general medical specialists in Beijing, and 11 departments for a sub-specialist training base.

Scope of service
Clinical departments:
 Cardiology Department
 Respiratory Medicine Department
 Endocrinology and Metabolism Department
 Nephrology Department
 Hematology Department
 Gastroenterology Department
 Rheumatology and Immunology Department
 Geriatrics Department
 Neurology Department
 Infectious Diseases Department
 Emergency Department
 Dermatology Department
 Traditional Chinese Medicine Department
 Occupational Disease Department
 Radiation Oncology Department
 Pediatrics Department
 General Surgery Department
 Orthopaedic Department
 Plastic Department
 Urology Department
 Thoracic surgery Department
 Critical Care Medicine Department
 Neurosurgery Department
 Interventional Radiology and Vascular Surgery Department
 Gynecology and obstetrics Department
 Institute of Sports Medicine
 Rehabilitation Medicine Department
 Critical Care Medicine Department
 Reproductive Medicine Center
 Ophthalmology Department (Eye Center)
 ENT Department
 Stomatology Department

Medical technology departments:
 Ultrasound Diagnosis Department
 Nuclear Medicine Department
 Radiology Department
 Blood Transfusion Department
 Pharmacy Department
 Laboratory Medicine Department　
 Pathology Department
 Medical Record Departmentment
 Operation Theatre
 Clinical Nutrition Department

External divisions
 The C.P.C. Central Committee Party School Branch Of Peking University Hospital
 The Second Clinic Of Peking University Third Hospital

References

External links 
 Official website mainly Chinese
 Official website mainly English

Hospitals established in 1958
Hospitals in Beijing
1958 establishments in China
Teaching hospitals in China
Peking University